Lester Anthony King (27 February 1939 – 9 July 1998) was a West Indian international cricketer who played in two Test matches, one in 1962 and the other in 1968. On his debut, in April 1962, he took five wickets in the first innings of the fifth test against India at Sabina Park, Kingston, Jamaica.

See also
 List of West Indies cricketers who have taken five-wicket hauls on Test debut

References

External links

1939 births
1998 deaths
West Indies Test cricketers
People from Saint Catherine Parish
Jamaican cricketers
East Zone cricketers
Cricketers who have taken five wickets on Test debut
Jamaica cricketers
Bengal cricketers